The Benedum Center for the Performing Arts (formerly the Stanley Theatre) is a theater and concert hall located at 237 7th Street in the Cultural District of Pittsburgh, Pennsylvania.  Designed by the Philadelphia architectural firm Hoffman-Henon, it was built in 1928 as the Stanley Theatre. The former movie palace was renovated and reopened as the Benedum Center for the Performing Arts in 1987.

History
The Stanley Theatre, built at a cost of $3 million, opened as a deluxe movie palace February 27, 1928, with seating for 3,800 people (it now seats 2,885). It was designed by the architectural firm Hoffman−Henon who were best known for their design of 35 theaters in the Philadelphia area. The Stanley Theatre was the largest movie theater in Western Pennsylvania.  Operated by the Stanley Warner Theatres circuit division of Warner Bros., it was Pittsburgh's main first run house for all Warner Bros. film releases.

Frank Sinatra played here December 10, 1943.

In 1974 War and King Crimson played at the Stanley.

On April 29, 1974, the King Biscuit Flower Hour recorded a show at the Stanley by Robin Trower for a later broadcast.

In 1976, the Stanley was purchased and renovated by the Cinemette Corporation to be operated as a movie theater. In 1977, DiCesare Engler Productions bought the theater.

September 23, 1978, Frank Zappa played two sets at the Stanley Theatre.

Live rock and roll concerts presented through 1984.

The Grateful Dead performed four shows at the venue, and reggae musician Bob Marley performed his last live concert there in 1980, before his death in 1981. The only known photographs from the show were featured in Kevin Macdonald's documentary film Marley.

Prince kicked off his Controversy Tour in 1981 at the Stanley. The rock band Kansas chose the Benedum Center to host its 40th Anniversary Fan Appreciation Concert on August 17, 2013, which all the original members were to attend.

The Stanley Theater was named "Number One Auditorium in the U.S." by Billboard several times during the DiCesare-Engler years.

Restoration

On September 25, 1987, after a $43 million restoration was completed, the Stanley reopened as the Benedum Center for the Performing Arts. In converting the former movie palace into a full performing arts center, a new building including an extension to the stage and support facilities was built at the rear of the theater. The interior was largely preserved and restored to its original design, with the addition of a new acoustical baffle covering the original proscenium.

The centerpiece of the auditorium is the large chandelier in the dome above the balcony. Its restoration was dedicated to the late H.J. Heinz II.

Today the center is the home of the Pittsburgh Opera, Pittsburgh Ballet Theatre, and Pittsburgh Civic Light Opera, all of which used to be based at Heinz Hall. The 2,800-seat Benedum Center is a centerpiece of the Pittsburgh Cultural District and is one of the most utilized theaters in the nation today.

The center has hosted several PBS doo-wop television concert specials including Doo Wop 50.  The TV game show Wheel of Fortune taped two weeks of shows at the theater for the first two weeks of their 16th season in 1998.

In popular culture
2011's Live Forever: September 23, 1980 • Stanley Theatre • Pittsburgh, PA was recorded at the center.
HBO's Boardwalk Empire mentioned a tap dancing act as having played "the Stanley" in Pittsburgh for three weeks during its season 4 premier.
The Benedum Center was featured prominently in the 2006 mockumentary film Pittsburgh directed by Jeff Goldblum. The film follows Goldblum's appearances in the Pittsburgh Civic Light Opera production of The Music Man staged at the theater.

See also

 List of concert halls
 Theatre in Pittsburgh

References

External links

 Benedum Center
 Pittsburgh Cultural Trust
  Pittsburgh Opera
  Stanley Theater History -Big Band Era
  Stanley Theater History -Rock Era

Theatres completed in 1928
City of Pittsburgh historic designations
Concert halls in Pennsylvania
Movie palaces
Music venues in Pittsburgh
Opera houses in Pennsylvania
Pennsylvania opera companies
Performing arts centers in Pennsylvania
Pittsburgh History & Landmarks Foundation Historic Landmarks
Theatres on the National Register of Historic Places in Pennsylvania
Theatres in Pennsylvania
Theatres in Pittsburgh
Music venues completed in 1977
1928 establishments in Pennsylvania
National Register of Historic Places in Pittsburgh
Event venues on the National Register of Historic Places in Pennsylvania